Monica Semedo (born 15 June 1984) is a former Luxembourgish TV presenter and politician who currently serves as a Member of the European Parliament after being elected in 2019.

Political career
In the European Parliament, Monica Semedo has been serving as full member of the Committee on Employment and Social Affairs and the Committee on Culture and Education. She is also a substitute member of the Committee on Economic and Monetary Affairs and the Subcommittee on Tax Matters. Since January 2021 Monica Semedo is no longer a member of the democratic party and is now referred to as an “ Independent “ Renew Europe member. 

In addition to her committee assignments, Semedo is part of the Parliament's delegation to the ACP–EU Joint Parliamentary Assembly. She is the Co-Chair of the Anti-Racism and Diversity Intergroup, of the Disability Intergroup and of the Intergroup on Social Economy. As member of the Committee on Economic and Monetary Affairs, she is also responsible for gender mainstreaming issues.

Personal life
Born in Luxembourg, Semedo is of Cape Verdean descent.

External links 
 Europe parliament: Monica Semedo

References

1984 births
Living people
MEPs for Luxembourg 2019–2024
Democratic Party (Luxembourg) MEPs
21st-century women MEPs for Luxembourg
RTL Group people
Luxembourgian people of Cape Verdean descent